Konush is a village in the municipality of Haskovo, in Haskovo Province, in southern Bulgaria.

Konush Hill on Trinity Peninsula in Antarctica is named after the village.

This village once belonged to the Hasköylü Ağalık, (Agaluk of Haskovo)

References

Villages in Haskovo Province